The Union Technique de l'Electricité et de la Communication (UTE) is the French national organisation for normalisation in the domain of electronics. It is a member of the International Electrotechnical Commission and of the CENELEC.

It was founded in 1907 as the Union des syndicats de l'électricité from a merger of the Syndicat professionnel des industries électriques and the Syndicat professionnel des usines d'électricité.

Florent Guillain was one of the first presidents.

References

External links
 

Electrical safety standards organizations
Trade associations based in France